Jamie Gregg (born March 18, 1985, in Edmonton, Alberta) is a Canadian long track speed skater.

Gregg was ranked 10th in overall World Cup standings for the 2009–10 season.  He is set to compete for Canada at the 2010 Winter Olympics in the 500 m. At the Olympics, Gregg competed in the Richmond Olympic Oval where he finished 8th in the 500 m as the top North American skater, one spot ahead of Jeremy Wotherspoon. He also competed at the 2014 Winter Olympics in Sochi, Russia. 

Gregg's younger sister Jessica Gregg also competed at the 2010 Olympics although she competed in short track speed skating.

Personal life
Gregg's father is five times Stanley Cup champion and Canadian former Olympian ice hockey player Randy Gregg. His mother Kathy Vogt participated in long track speed skating for Canada at the 1976 and 1980 Winter Olympics. His sister Sarah Gregg is a former international speed skater and Jessica Gregg is a national team short track speed skater and he is married to Canadian speed skater Danielle Wotherspoon-Gregg. Gregg is currently a third year in medical school at the University of Alberta, set to graduate in 2019.

References

1985 births
Living people
Canadian male speed skaters
Speed skaters at the 2010 Winter Olympics
Speed skaters at the 2014 Winter Olympics
Olympic speed skaters of Canada
Speed skaters from Edmonton
21st-century Canadian people